Dávid Görgényi (born 16 August 1990) is a professional Hungarian footballer who plays for Ajka.

Club statistics

Updated to games played as of 1 March 2014.

External links
 HLSZ 
 MLSZ 
 

1990 births
People from Mór
Sportspeople from Fejér County
Living people
Hungarian footballers
Hungary youth international footballers
Association football defenders
Vasas SC players
Vác FC players
FC Ajka players
Nemzeti Bajnokság I players
Nemzeti Bajnokság II players